In mountaineering in the United States, a thirteener (abbreviated 13er) is a mountain that exceeds  above mean sea level, similar to the more familiar "fourteeners," which exceed .  In most instances, "thirteeners" refers only to those peaks between 13,000 and 13,999 feet in elevation.

The importance of thirteeners is greatest in Colorado, which has the majority of such peaks in North America with over 600 of them.  Despite the large number of peaks, over 20 peak baggers have reported climbing all of Colorado's thirteeners. Thirteeners are also significant in states whose highpoints fall between 13,000 and 13,999 feet. For example, the Wyoming thirteeners are the highest peaks within the state, and only 5 individuals have reported climbing all 35 peaks, likely due to a combination of technical difficulty and remoteness.

Not all summits over 13,000 feet qualify as thirteeners, but only those summits that mountaineers consider to be independent. Objective standards for independence include topographic prominence and isolation (distance from a higher summit), or a combination. However thirteener lists do not always consistently use such objective rules.  A rule commonly used by mountaineers in the contiguous United States is that a peak must have at least  of prominence to qualify.  According to the Mountaineering Club of Alaska, it is standard in Alaska to use a  prominence rule rather than a 300-foot rule.  These are the standards applied for the lists below. Regarding whether or not peaks in excess of 13,999 feet should be considered as "thirteeners", this article will count them as such for statistical purposes, but concentrate its focus on those peaks less than 14,000 feet since the higher peaks are already covered in the fourteeners list.

List of United States thirteeners by state 
Thirteeners are found in nine U.S. states.  This table summarizes their numbers based on each state's prominence criteria:

Colorado

By the most detailed count, Colorado has 637 peaks that exceed  and meet the prominence criteria, of which 53 are fourteeners.  The highest of them less than 14,000 feet are as follows (the rank includes higher peaks):

Grizzly Peak is not only the name of Colorado's highest thirteener, but the state has four other Grizzly Peaks plus one Grizzly Mountain on the list:

Other notable Colorado thirteeners include:

California 
California has the second greatest number of thirteeners with 149 of them, of which 12 are fourteeners. The highest under 14,000 feet are as follows (the rank includes higher peaks):

Other notable California thirteeners include:

Alaska
Alaska has at least 41 thirteeners that meet its more stringent prominence criteria of 500 ft, of which 20 are also fourteeners.  Different sources list varying numbers  of 13,000+ ft peaks in the state, mainly because many of the peaks (especially those that are sub-peaks of a higher mountain) are unnamed and have no spot elevations given on the USGS topographical maps.  Using a 300' interpolated prominence criterion, there are 61 13,000+ ft peaks in Alaska.  The following list may miss a few peaks that should be included:

Wyoming
Wyoming has 35 thirteeners with at least 300 ft of interpolated prominence, but no fourteeners. 31 of the 35 are located in the rugged and remote Wind River Range. Several of the Wyoming thirteeners require glacier travel and/or rock climbing up to the 5.4 YDS difficulty level to reach the summit, and most climbers spend multiple days backpacking to reach most of these peaks.  The highest of them are:

Other notable Wyoming thirteeners include:

Utah
Utah has 17 thirteeners with at least 300 ft of prominence, but no fourteeners.  All of them are located in the remote Uinta Mountains near the Wyoming border. The highest of the thirteeners are:

New Mexico

Hawaii
Hawaii has two thirteeners, the great shield volcanoes which comprise the bulk of the Big Island of Hawaii.

Nevada
Nevada has only a single thirteener that meets the threshold for inclusion, Wheeler Peak in Great Basin National Park with an impressive  of prominence.  However, the highest point in the state is Boundary Peak, which is a sub-peak of California's Montgomery Peak with only  of prominence.

Washington
Mount Rainier is the only mountain in Washington state that exceeds , and it has two summits that meet the prominence criteria, both of which are included on the list of fourteeners.

See also

Outline of the United States
Index of United States-related articles
Fourteener
Mountain peaks of Alaska
Mountain peaks of California
Mountain peaks of Colorado
Mountain peaks of the Rocky Mountains
Mountain peaks of the United States

References

External links
 listsofjohn.com (Full listing of US 13ers excluding Alaska)
Peak Lists by Gerry Roach (Lists of thirteeners in several states)
 13ers.com - Home of Colorado's Thirteeners (Mountains Between 13,000 and 14,000 feet)
 Climb13ers.com - Peakbagging Info (including routes, maps & photos) for Colorado 13ers
 SunlitSummit.com - Photos and Trip Report for all of the Wyoming 13ers

Mountains
Lists of mountains
Peak bagging in the United States